is a fictional monster, or kaiju, in Legendary Pictures' MonsterVerse media franchise and based on Toho Co., Ltd.'s character of the same name. The character first appeared in Godzilla (2014), directed by Gareth Edwards. This incarnation of Godzilla is depicted as the sole survivor of a prehistoric superspecies, theorized by Ishirō Serizawa, acting as a force of nature that maintains balance. The character was initially designed by Matt Allsopp, modeled after the Toho version. It is the third incarnation of Godzilla to be created by an American studio, after Hanna-Barbera's 1978 animated series Godzilla and TriStar Pictures' 1998 film Godzilla, and overall the tenth onscreen incarnation of the iconic character.

Overview

Name
Godzilla is referred to by Ishirō Serizawa, played by Ken Watanabe, as "Gojira" (ゴジラ) though later on he would be referred to by other characters as "Godzilla". Watanabe argued with the producer to have his character refer to Godzilla by his Japanese name, stating, "the important thing is where the icon comes from. The first [movie] it was very important for me to call him Gojira, and I explained that his name was the really correct version I needed to say." In the 2014 video game Godzilla, he is labeled as "Hollywood Godzilla" to distinguish him from other iterations present in the game.

In Godzilla: King of the Monsters, Godzilla is given the scientific name "Titanus Gojira", after the designation for the monsters was changed from "MUTOs" (Massive Unidentified Terrestrial Organisms) to "Titans."

Design
Producer Thomas Tull was adamant about keeping Godzilla's design consistent with the Toho version, stating, "We had to make triply sure we got it right. Godzilla had to look like Godzilla. Period." In February 2014, Legendary debuted the final design of their Godzilla on the cover of Empire. Director Gareth Edwards and the design group reviewed all previous incarnations of Godzilla's design for inspiration. Edwards stated, "The way I tried to view it was to imagine Godzilla was a real creature and someone from Toho saw him in the 1950s and ran back to the studio to make a movie about the creature and was trying their best to remember it and draw it. And in our film you get to see him for real." He went on to say that his Godzilla remains true to the original in all aspects. Edwards also stressed that, "It was important to me that this felt like a Toho Godzilla" and concluded by wishing, "I'd love ours (Godzilla) to be considered as part of the Toho group."

Much like the previous American incarnation of the character, the MonsterVerse Godzilla has a square shaped face on a broad neck. He also possesses gills despite being an amphibian. According to Andrew Baker, the filmmakers studied the faces of dogs, bears, and eagles to make Godzilla's face look noble and majestic, yet not too cute or threatening. Director Gareth Edwards also stated that they tried to sharpen and straighten his face and his body so it's less rounded.

In King of the Monsters, Godzilla was given a slight revamp in his design, notably his dorsal plates changing in size and shape, more jagged and reminiscent of his 1954 design. He has also grown larger in size due to him being more active following the battle of San Francisco. As well as the claws on his feet being longer and pointier, his eyes glow when charging up his atomic breath. His atomic breath in 2014 was weakened due to the MUTOs' electromagnetic pulses and has since increased in mass and power.

Personality
For the 2014 version, Edwards designed Godzilla to have a personality that would evoke the "last samurai" archetype, calling him "a lone, ancient warrior who prefers to be left alone until world events force him to resurface."

Size

Reception
IndieWire called Godzilla's design "more classic than groundbreaking", with praise for the size, scale, fins, sound design, and visual effects, stating, "The visuals are really impressive and perhaps more importantly, feel realistic to the world of the movie around it." Screenwriter Kazuki Nakajima criticized the 2014 film for turning Godzilla into a "good guy", stating it is "the sort of Godzilla aimed at kids in the late Showa Era." Illustrator Yuji Kaida praised the 2014 film for treating Godzilla like "a force beyond human understanding that maintained the Earth’s natural balance," as well as praising the physique of the design and how Edwards conveyed the mass.

Appearances
A post-credits scene in Kong: Skull Island featured cave paintings of Godzilla, Rodan, Mothra and King Ghidorah. In July 2022, Toho confirmed that the untitled Godzilla vs. Kong sequel would feature Godzilla. Godzilla, along with the MUTOs and the creatures from Edwards' debut film Monsters, were briefly seen in cave paintings in Rogue One (2016), also directed by Edwards. Edwards stated that the characters were added by the crew as a joke.

Films
 Godzilla (2014)
 Godzilla: King of the Monsters (2019)
 Godzilla vs. Kong (2021)
 Untitled Godzilla vs. Kong sequel (2024)

Television
 Godzilla and the Titans (TBA)

Comics
Godzilla: Awakening (2014)
Godzilla: Aftershock (2019)
Godzilla Dominion (2021)

Novels
Godzilla: The Official Movie Novelization (2014)
Godzilla: King of the Monsters – The Official Movie Novelization (2019)
Godzilla vs. Kong – The Official Movie Novelization (2021)

Games
 Godzilla: Strike Zone (Android, iOS – 2014)
 Godzilla: Crisis Defense (Browser – 2014)
 Godzilla: Smash3 (Android and iOS – 2014)
 Godzilla (PlayStation 3 and PlayStation 4 – 2014) – as Hollywood Godzilla
 Godzilla: Kaiju Collection (Android and iOS – 2015)
 PUBG Mobile (Android and iOS – 2021)
 World of Warships (PC, PlayStation 4, Xbox One – 2021)
 Godzilla Battle Line (Android and iOS – 2021)
 Call of Duty: Warzone (PC, PlayStation 4, PlayStation 5, Xbox One, Xbox Series X/S – 2022)

References

Sources

 

Godzilla characters
Toho monsters
Film characters introduced in 2014
Fictional characters with nuclear or radiation abilities
Fictional characters with accelerated healing
Fictional characters with superhuman strength
Fictional prehistoric characters
Fictional reptiles
Fictional dinosaurs
Fictional dragons
Fictional dragonslayers
Fictional giants
Fictional sea monsters
Animated characters
Kaiju
MonsterVerse characters